Roger (Ruggiero) Morigi (4 October 1907 – 12 January 1995) was an Italian-born American stone carver and architectural sculptor. He made major contributions to Washington National Cathedral and other Washington, D.C. buildings. He was the teacher and mentor of sculptor Frederick Hart.

The National Cathedral's Master Carver Gargoyle, modeled and carved by John Guarente in the 1960s, is a caricature of Morigi.

Early career
He was born in Bisuschio, Lombardy, the son of Napoleone and Josephine Ronchetti Morigi. He apprenticed under his stone carver father, beginning at age 11, and studied at the Accademia di Belle Arti di Brera in Milan. He emigrated to the United States in 1927, and worked with his father on projects in New Haven, Connecticut and elsewhere. He was hired as a carver by the John Donnelly Company, and moved to Washington, D.C. in 1932 to work on the U.S. Supreme Court Building.

Morigi carved the eight marble relief panels on the bases of the twin lampstands that flank the Supreme Court's plaza. He may have carved the marble portions of the twin flagpole bases. He did interior work on the building, including carving in marble sculptor Adolph A. Weinman's larger-than-life relief sculpture of Moses—one of eighteen figures in the Courtroom's Great Lawmakers of History Frieze.

Sculptor C. Paul Jennewein modeled The Four Elements, a set of Art Deco female nudes, for the fifth-floor lobby of what is now the Robert F. Kennedy Department of Justice Building. Morigi carved the allegorical figures in limestone, assisted by Bruno Mankowski and William Kapp. They all collaborated (with Otto Thieleman) on carving in limestone Jennewein's architrave over the building's Constitution Avenue entrance.

For the entrance to what is now the E. Barrett Prettyman Federal Courthouse, Jennewein modeled the Trylon of Freedom, a 24-foot (7.32 m), three-sided freestanding column. Each side represented a branch of the federal government, illustrated in relief vignettes. Morigi was its principal carver, with assistance from contractor Vincent Torelli. Jennewein also modeled four half-life-sized allegorical figures representing The Four Freedoms for one of the courtrooms, and Morigi carved them in marble.

Washington National Cathedral

Morigi began work as a carver at the National Cathedral in 1950, and was promoted to master carver in 1956, a position he held for 22 years. "Highly respected, he was a temperamental perfectionist who didn't tolerate incompetence and wasn't shy about sharing his opinions."

Sculptor Heinz Warneke modeled the tympanum for the South Portal. It featured a tableau of The Last Supper and a three-panel frieze of The Road to Emmaus. Morigi (with Edward H. Ratti) carved the limestone tympanum in situ from scaffolding. Warneke modeled his Saint Alban trumeau figure for the pier below it, and Morigi carved the figure in limestone. Morigi himself later modeled and carved in situ (with Frank Zic) the 44 angels of the Nature of Christ archivolt, that surround the tympanum. Warneke also modeled and Morigi carved a piece in memory of Joseph Ratti, one of the Cathedral's carvers, who died in a 1955 fall from scaffolding. Located inside the South Transept, the memorial stone depicts Ratti carving a never-to-be-finished gargoyle.

Sculptor Walker Hancock modeled the altarpiece for the Good Shepherd Chapel in 1957, and Morigi carved it in limestone. Hancock would later model the central figure of Christ in Majesty for the High Altar, which Morigi carved in limestone (with Frank Zic).

In the 1950s and 1960s, Morigi carved the Saints of All Nations series, a set of half-life-sized limestone niche figures. Many of these were modeled by sculptor Marian Brackenridge, three by William McVey, two by Hancock, and the rest by a variety of sculptors. Each figure took Morigi about a month to carve. They were installed on ornate corbels above the pointed arches of the Nave's north and south side aisles.

Frederick Hart

After being rejected several times by Morigi, a 23-year-old Frederick Hart began an apprenticeship under him in 1967. Morigi started his student with minor challenges, carving floral or geometric work or ceiling bosses, and gradually gave him more responsibility. Morigi encouraged him to enter the 1971 design competition to create the three tympana for the West Portal. After three years, and multiple rounds of revisions, Hart was awarded the commission. Hart's famous design for the central tympanum, Ex Nihilo, featured nebulous figures floating in a swirling mass.  Morigi carved Hart's related trumeau figure of Adam (1974–1978) – eyes closed, not yet fully formed, "still in a state of becoming" – for the pier between the Cathedral's main doors. Adam was the last work Morigi completed prior to retirement—he quipped: "I finished where God began."

Personal
Vincent Palumbo succeeded Morigi as the Cathedral's master carver in 1978. Folklorist Marjorie Hunt spent years interviewing the carvers, and made them the subject of her PhD dissertation. She interviewed Morigi and Palumbo in The Stone Carvers: Master Craftsmen of Washington National Cathedral, a 1984 documentary film by Paul Wagner, that won the 1985 Academy Award for Best Documentary Short Subject. Hunt adapted her work into a 1999 book.

Morigi lived in Hyattsville, Maryland, with his wife Louise and children Francis and Elayne. He was an avid golfer. Carver John Guarente caricatured Morigi in a 1960s gargoyle, portraying him as a devil holding carving tools and wearing a golf cap. To depict his notorious temper, Guarente carved a mushroom cloud bursting out of the top of his head. "The Master Carver Gargoyle" is now one of the Cathedral's most popular sculptures.

Morigi died January 12, 1995, of emphysema.

Quotes
"A stone carver is inclined to be an honest man. An executive may embellish his résumé, but a stone carver's work is there for all to see. No matter how well he writes, it does not change the quality of the carving."
"You don't teach anybody to carve. You give them the fundamentals of carving, like you take a hammer and a point and you hit, you take a chisel and cut. But the main thing in carving, you steal carving. [Y]ou have two or three carvers working in the same place, so you watch one, you watch the other; you steal a little bit from one, you steal a little bit from the other. Then you put it all together yourself. You develop your own technique."
"Technique is different one man to another. Two, three, four, five carvers can carve the same thing, but every one of them would have a different touch, what we call a touch, you know, a certain technique that differentiates the one from the other one and the other one. It's just like you sign your own name."
"The drawing is the most important thing. The architect makes the drawing, and you've got to go by that. You're not doing it on your own. Each stone has its own design. Each stone has to fit."
"You have to have the ability to understand and interpret each different sculptor's style. You have to change your own technique to please the sculptor. When you work [from] a model, you've got to pay attention to the form and get the form like the model. You can't stick the stone back like clay. You cut one time, and that's it; it's down on the floor. You've got to restrain yourself and be sure that you do what's in the model, that you copy the model to perfection."
"You cut and cut and all of a sudden you see something grow. The more you work, the better it comes out. You feel good inside. You work, it gets brilliant, you see it move. I don't know, it fills you with some kind of emotion—such a sense of satisfaction."

Selected works

Washington, D.C. Federal Buildings
United States Supreme Court Building
2 lampstands (marble, 1935), carved by the John Donnelly Company.
 8 relief panels, carved by Morigi.
 Moses (marble, 1935), Adolph A. Weinman, sculptor, Morigi, carver. Part of the Courtroom's Great Lawmakers of History Frieze.

U.S. Department of Agriculture Administration Building
 Shepherd and His Flock

Department of Commerce Building
Foreign and Domestic Commerce pediment (limestone, 1934), James Earle Fraser, sculptor, carved by the John Donnelly Company.

Department of the Post Office Building
Transmission of the Mail by Day and by Night relief panels (limestone, 1932–1934), Adolph A. Weinman, sculptor, Anthony de Francisci, modeler, carved by the John Donnelly Company.
Day, male figure flying beside an eagle
Night, female figure flying beside an owl
The Spirit of Progress and Civilization pediment (limestone, 1934), Adolph A. Weinman, sculptor, carved by the John Donnelly Company.

Department of Labor Building
 Abundance and Industry pediment (limestone, 1935), Sherry Fry, sculptor
 Commerce and Communication pediment (limestone, 1935), Wheeler Williams, sculptor.

Robert F. Kennedy Department of Justice Building
Lege Atque Ordine Omnia Fiunt architrave (limestone, 1935), C. Paul Jennewein, sculptor, William Kapp, Bruno Mankowski, Roger Morini & Otto Thieleman, carvers.
The Four Elements: Earth, Air, Water, Fire (limestone, 1933–1936), C. Paul Jennewein, sculptor, Morigi, carver (with Bruno Mankowski & William Kapp).

E. Barrett Prettyman Federal Courthouse
 Trylon of Freedom (limestone, 1954), C. Paul Jennewein, sculptor, Morigi, carver, Vincent Tonelli, contractor. The three sides of the freestanding column represent the three branches of the federal government.
 The Four Freedoms: Religion, Speech, Assembly, Press (marble, year), four half-life-sized allegorical figures.

Washington National Cathedral
South Portal:
 The Last Supper Tympanum (limestone, 1953–1959), Heinz Warneke, sculptor, Morigi, carver (with Edward H. Ratti).
 The Road to Emmaus Frieze (limestone, 1953–1959), Heinz Warneke, sculptor, Morigi, carver (with Edward H. Ratti).
 Saint Alban (limestone, 1959–1961), trumeau figure, Heinz Warneke, sculptor, Morigi, carver.
 The Nature of Christ Archivolt – "44 Angels" (limestone, 1966–1971), modeled & carved by Morigi (with Frank Zic).
Saints of All Nations:
 Saint Andrew of Scotland (limestone, 1956), Wilson Bay, Marian Brackenridge, sculptor, Morigi, carver.
 John Calvin (limestone, 1956), Wilson Bay, Marian Brackenridge, sculptor, Morigi, carver.
 Saint Joan of Arc (limestone, 1957), Mellon Bay, Marian Brackenridge, sculptor, Morigi, carver.
 Saint Patrick of Ireland (limestone, 1959), Mellon Bay, Marian Brackenridge, sculptor, Morigi, carver.
 Saint Francis of Assisi (limestone, 1959), Humanitarian Bay, Marian Brackenridge, sculptor, Morigi, carver.
 Saint Stephen of Hungary (limestone, 1960), Carl L. Bush, sculptor, Morigi, carver.
 Saint Olaf of Norway (limestone, 1962), Humanitarian Bay, Stinius Fredriksen, sculptor, Morigi, carver.
 Saint Teresa of Avila (limestone, 1964), N.C.A. Bay, Joseph Coletti, sculptor, Morigi, carver.
 Ulrich Zwingli (limestone, 1965), Lee-Jackson Bay, Walker Hancock, sculptor, Morigi, carver.
 Isabella Thoburn (limestone, 1966), N.C.A. Bay, Marian Brackenridge, sculptor, Morigi, carver.
 Martin Luther (limestone, 1967), Lee-Jackson Bay, Walker Hancock, sculptor, Morigi, carver.
 Saint Margaret of Scotland (limestone, year), Churchill Porch, William McVey, sculptor, Morigi, carver.
 Jan Hus of Bohemia (limestone, year), William McVey, sculptor, Morigi, carver.
 Saint Olga of Kiev (limestone, year), William McVey, sculptor, Morigi, carver.
 Saint Birgitta of Sweden (limestone, year), Dulin Bay, Morigi, carver.
 Soren Kierkegaard (limestone, year), Dulin Bay, Morigi, carver.
 Saint Junípero Serra (limestone, year), White Bay, Morigi, carver.
 Christ the Good Shepherd Altarpiece (limestone, 1957), Good Shepherd Chapel, Walker Hancock, sculptor, Morigi, carver.
 Christ in Majesty (limestone, 1967–1972), over High Altar, Walker Hancock, sculptor, Morigi, carver (with Frank Zic).
 George Washington Tympanum (limestone, year), Washington Bay, Lee Lawrie, sculptor, Morigi, carver. Depicts Washington as a farmer and as a soldier.
 Adam (limestone, 1974–1978), trumeau figure, West Portal, Frederick Hart, sculptor, Morigi, carver. The last piece Morigi carved for the Cathedral. 
Hart's famous tympanum, Ex Nihilo (carved by Vincent Palumbo), is directly above Adam.

References

External links
 Memorial by U.S. Senator Strom Thurmond, The Congressional Record, January 18, 1995

1907 births
1995 deaths
American architectural sculptors
Italian emigrants to the United States
Artists from Milan
People from Hyattsville, Maryland
Stone carvers
Deaths from emphysema
American people of Italian descent
People from the Province of Varese